This is a summary of notable incidents that have taken place at various SeaWorld Parks & Entertainment-owned amusement parks, water parks or theme parks. This list is not intended to be a comprehensive list of every such event, but only those that have a significant impact on the parks or park operations, or are otherwise significantly newsworthy.

The term incidents refers to major accidents, injuries, or deaths that occur at a SeaWorld Parks facility. While these incidents were required to be reported to regulatory authorities due to where they occurred, they usually fall into one of the following categories:

 Caused by negligence on the part of a guest. This can be refusal to follow specific ride safety instructions, or deliberate intent to violate park rules.
 The result of a guest's known, or unknown, health issues.
 Negligence on the part of the park, either by ride operator or maintenance.
 Act of God or a generic accident (e.g. slipping and falling) that is not a direct result of an action on anybody's part.

Adventure Island Tampa Bay

 On September 10, 2011, a 21-year-old lifeguard was killed after being struck by lightning while clearing guests from the Key West Rapids ride tower due to inclement weather. No injuries to the guests were reported. The park installed a system in place to warn of incoming weather.

Aquatica

Orlando, Florida location
 On October 4, 2010, a 68-year-old man from Manchester, England was found unresponsive on Roa's Rapids. He was taken to Dr. Phillips Hospital but was later pronounced dead on arrival. Preliminary findings found he died of natural causes.
 On July 15, 2017, a 58-year-old man from Savannah, Georgia was also found unresponsive on Roa's Rapids. He died the next day. It was later revealed he had a history of health problems.

San Antonio, Texas location
 On July 1, 2018, a woman was found unresponsive after riding the Wahalla Wave water slide. She was given CPR by lifeguards before being taken to a nearby Christus Santa Rosa Hospital.
 On August 1, 2019, lifeguards responded to an incident which occurred at Big Surf Shores where a 33-year-old man went into cardiac arrest while in the park's wave pool. He was taken to Christus Santa Rosa Westover Hills hospital by the San Antonio EMS and later died.

Busch Gardens Tampa

Cheetah Hunt 

Firefighters from the city of Tampa were able to evacuate all riders safely with no injuries.

Edge of Africa
 On May 12, 2002, a 21-year-old zookeeper had her arm bitten off at the elbow by one of the park's lions as she was conducting a behind-the-scenes tour for her family. Park operations were not affected.

Stanleyville 
 On July 1, 2016, an orangutan escaped from its pen. Portions of the park went on lockdown and were evacuated. This was the second orangutan escape in a one-month time period, the first being in Jungala.

SheiKra

On October 15, 2005, there was a problem with the ride's air compressor system after a technical glitch occurred. Passengers were stranded on the coaster's holding brake at the edge of the platform for nearly an hour until they were eventually brought down by a rescue trolley.
 On May 12, 2016, a malfunction caused the ride to stop, stranding 24 riders  in the air for up to two hours. Busch Gardens officials evacuated all of the 24 riders safely, and no injuries were reported. SheiKra reopened on May 16, 2016.

Gwazi

 On July 24, 2006, a 52-year-old man from Palm Harbor, Florida died shortly after riding Gwazi. After riding, he had difficulty breathing, then collapsed. Paramedics performed CPR, but the victim was pronounced dead two hours later. The medical examiner's report showed that he suffered from high blood pressure and hardening of the arteries. The ride was closed for an hour after the incident to confirm that it was functioning properly.

Gunfire incident
 On July 4, 2018, a 36-year-old man from Florahome, Florida was hit by a falling bullet from celebratory gunfire while visiting the park with his wife during Independence Day. At around 10:00 p.m. when the fireworks were starting to go off, he began to feel some pain on one of his shoulders. Park security began to respond to the incident and the man was airlifted to a nearby Tampa General Hospital with non-life-threatening injuries.

Kumba

 On June 10, 1995, a 13-year-old girl from Pinellas Park, Florida, died shortly after riding Kumba, due to a rare heart condition she had that triggered a heart attack. Her mother sued the park and won a judgment of $500,000. The jury cited the park for failing to administer CPR in a timely manner and slowing rescue efforts. The jury also cited the mother as 30% responsible for the victim's death, thereby reducing the award amount to $350,000. Reasons given were the mother's previous drug abuse possibly contributing to the victim's health problems.
On December 29, 1996, passengers on board a train were evacuated off of the ride after being stopped  in the air, and then operators returned it to the loading area. Five people were taken to nearby hospitals in Tampa, Florida after complaining from suffering back pain after riding.

Montu

On May 24, 2000, a 30-year-old man died from suffering a heart attack after riding the coaster. The victim had a preexisting heart ailment.

Python

The ride's previous tagline, "I challenged the Python and lived!", was subsequently removed.

Rhino Rally

 On June 27, 2001, a ride vehicle overturned along the course of the attraction. Multiple riders suffered minor injuries and two were taken to the hospital.

Skyride

He was verifying that the gondola door was closed as the gondola left the station, and ended up being carried about  along the ride. None of the guests on the ride were injured, and Bonani was taken to St. Joseph's Hospital.

Busch Gardens Williamsburg

Apollo's Chariot

 On the maiden voyage of the ride Apollo's Chariot on March 27, 1999, a stray goose collided with the front chariot in which Italian actor Fabio Lanzoni was seated. Fabio suffered a minor cut to his nose, leaving him with a bloody nose at the end of the ride.
 On July 15, 2018, a family from Virginia Beach, Virginia suffered injuries as they were riding the roller coaster due to a ride operator accidentally pressing the emergency stop button, causing them to report concussions the next day.

Busch Gardens Railway

 On August 16, 2018, a fire started at the Caribou Train Station near the InvadR roller coaster and the Le Scoot Log Flume in the New France section of the park at around 3:30 p.m. An employee suffered minor injuries and was taken for medical treatment as a precaution.

Escape from Pompeii

 On July 21, 2018, a small fire started at the roof of the ride's attraction building at around 8:15 p.m. The ride was closed and was not operating at the time when the incident occurred. Firefighters responded and quickly extinguished the fire. The ride re-opened a few days later.

Griffon

 On August 5, 2010, a large  inflatable prop in the process of deflation was blown away by a strong wind during an oncoming storm and collided with one of Griffon's trains, sending five guests to a local hospital with minor injuries. They were released shortly thereafter. The park stated that "The storm was too far to be dangerous", although some of the older rides that take longer to shut down were beginning to close.

Big Bad Wolf

 On August 2, 1984, the ride was temporarily shut down after one of the coaster's cars fell from a storage track as it was being checked for maintenance. There were no injuries, but the front of the car had superficial damage to its fiberglass after plunging several feet to the ground.
 On May 2, 1993, a 63-year-old employee was struck in the head by the popular suspended roller coaster while supposedly trying to uncover a camera specifically placed to monitor a portion of the coaster's track. The man died about a day later due to his injuries.
 On March 1, 2003, a contractor hired to perform off-season painting work was killed while painting the Big Bad Wolf. The man was painting on a high-reach vehicle which overturned. James City County fire officials said the man was dead by the time they reached him.

Loch Ness Monster

 On June 13, 1989, five park guests were injured on the Loch Ness Monster roller coaster when a train collided with a tree at an estimated . The tree had been blown onto the coaster's tracks by a sudden storm. The collision happened on a slightly banked right turn that follows a minor descent from the coaster's second lift hill. There were supposedly twenty-five riders in the train at the time of the incident. A 16-year-old boy suffered a broken leg, but he was later released in stable condition. Four other people were treated for minor injuries. While the riders were stranded, another train began its usual course. The train plummeted down the ride's  major descent just before passing through the upper loop of the coaster's two interlocking loops. An additional train, dispatched after the first train stopped, was stopped at an earlier block on the track (the safety system functioning as designed). The train involved in the collision was severely damaged when the front right corner of the first car was totally torn away from the rest of the train.
On June 3, 1993, two riders claimed that the special misting water effect at the ride's tunnel entrance was caustic and temporarily blinding, causing emotional distress. A park public relations manager testified the mist only sprayed water and had been subsequently removed.

Eagle One Monorail

 On August 11, 1990, a 19-year-old mother threw her four-month-old daughter onto the tracks of the park's monorail. The baby supposedly fell at least . The event occurred at one of the monorail's loading stations located at the Anheuser-Busch Hospitality Center. A monorail operator spotted the baby and immediately shut off the power. Although the baby did have extensive injuries to her head, she was rushed to Riverside Regional Medical Center in stable condition and ultimately recovered. The mother was in an altercation with the baby's 18-year-old father when the baby was reportedly tossed over a fence and into the path of the monorail. Although the mother stated that the baby slipped out of her arms, that claim was dismissed due to the height of the fence. A source stated that the mother confessed to throwing her baby girl onto the tracks in order to prove to the baby's father that it was her baby and she could have done whatever she wanted to her. Both the father and mother were charged with child endangerment.

Pantheon

On October 24, 2019, at around 8:00 a.m., the James City County Fire Department reported that a worker fell and suffered injuries while doing construction on the park's newest roller coaster. The victim was airlifted and hospitalized at Sentara Norfolk General Hospital by Nightingale.

Roman Rapids

On July 10, 1991, a 46-year-old woman hurt her knee after falling off the ride's platform into a raft.
On July 26, 1991, a woman fractured her wrist after she slipped and fell from the ride's observation deck while trying to watch her family that was on one of the rafts. A rainstorm had just passed over the area at the time which forced all the rides and attractions to be shut down temporarily inside the park. When it later re-opened, there were no signs posted to warn all guests of the wet slippery surfaces in case of injury.

Tempesto

 On June 29, 2015, a 17-year-old girl's shoulder collar came loose during the ride. The park shut down the ride but reopened it fifteen minutes later, and stated the collar was added for guest comfort instead of safety.

Discovery Cove

 On January 29, 2009, a 59-year-old man from Sale, Greater Manchester, England died after having cut his toe on coral while swimming with fish. The victim, a hemophiliac, who was rushed to Wythenshawe Hospital via air ambulance, was diagnosed with septic shock and organ failure, and doctors amputated both legs below the knee to prevent infections. The coroner ruled the death "accidental", due to group B streptococcal septicaemia.
 On August 16, 2011, three guests and five employees were injured after lightning struck inside Discovery Cove. All eight people were transported to a local hospital as a precaution. They were all released from the hospital by the next day. Park personnel had told guests to get out of the pools; the guests were sheltering at different locations inside the park when the incident happened.

SeaWorld Ohio

 On August 17, 1996, an  motorboat wrecked into the ski stadium audience of 4,000 people and injured 22 of them. Those injured aged from 2 to 78, and four were in critical condition. The boat was a part of the Baywatch Ski Show and crashed after a mechanical failure.

SeaWorld San Antonio

Parking lot
 On June 24, 2018, a 5-year-old girl from Aubrey, Texas was killed after being run over by a white pickup truck in the SeaWorld parking lot in San Antonio. The girl and her family were leaving the park at the time around 8:00 pm. She was in a hurry to get to their car and was separated from her parents. A driver ran her over, fatally injuring the girl at the scene.

SeaWorld San Diego

Bayside Skyride
 On February 18, 2019, 16 guests were stranded on five gondolas when a strong gust of wind suddenly stopped the ride after activating its circuit breaker. It took more than four hours for all the guests to be evacuated from all the gondolas.

Guest altercations
 On October 11, 1979, a security guard shot and wounded a visitor moments after the man scuffled with guards and reportedly made a furtive move as though reaching for a weapon. The shooting was found to be justifiable.

SeaWorld Orlando

 On July 6, 1999, a 27-year-old man was found nude in the pool draped over the back of the killer whale named Tilikum. Although there was some media speculation of hypothermia, the autopsy report said that the cause of death was drowning and that there was trauma. He had visited SeaWorld the previous day, stayed after the park closed, and evaded security to enter the orca tank. A spokesman for the sheriff's office said, "There was no obvious signs of trauma to the body. He wasn't chewed. He wasn't dismembered." However, the coroner reported finding scrapes and bruises all over the body, some of which had occurred after the victim had died. The coroner also discovered more significant injuries, such as puncture wounds on the victim's leg and his scrotum having been "ripped open". Divers also found small pieces of the victim's body at the bottom of the pool.
 On February 24, 2010, 40-year-old trainer Dawn Brancheau, who had 15 years of experience at the park, died in another incident involving Tilikum. SeaWorld's head of animal training said that during a rubdown after the show, Tilikum pulled Brancheau into the water by her ponytail, and she drowned. Eyewitness trainers and audience members, however, stated that Tilikum dragged her into the water by her left forearm, near the end of the show. The autopsy report said she died from drowning and traumatic injuries, including removal of her scalp. This was the third time since being first put on public display that Tilikum had been involved in a human death. By February 27, SeaWorld Orlando whale shows resumed with trainers practicing increased caution and not joining the whales in the water. SeaWorld announced they have invited experts from outside marine parks and aquariums to review SeaWorld's handling of killer whales and also Tilikum specifically.

 On August 23, 2010, the Occupational Safety and Health Administration (OSHA) fined the park US$75,000 for three infractions, two of which were directly related to this incident. One related citation was designated as "willful" and was "committed with plain indifference to or intentional disregard for employee safety and health". The other related citation was a "serious" violation relating to a missing safety rail at Shamu Stadium. At the time of the fine, SeaWorld called OSHA's findings "unfounded". Later hearings revealed that SeaWorld had concealed an earlier incident when another whale, Ikaika, had bitten a trainer in 2006. During a hearing where SeaWorld continued its challenge of OSHA's findings, former SeaWorld trainer Jeff Andrews - being presented as an expert - stated his opinion that the victim died as a result of a mistake she had made while near the water. He continued that he did not agree that Tilikum showed "aggressive behavior" during the incident. On May 31, 2012, an OSHA administrative law judge cited SeaWorld for two violations in the death of the trainer and fined the company a total of $12,000. The final decision was issued on June 11, 2012.

Sesame Place (Pennsylvania)

 On July 5, 2018, the park closed early due to a water main break that happened in Middletown Township, Bucks County, Pennsylvania leaving many businesses temporarily closed. The park reopened two days later on July 7.
 On August 9, 2020, a 17-year-old park employee was punched in the face by a man and a woman some time after informing them to wear a face mask per the park's policies that were enacted in response to the COVID-19 pandemic. The employee sustained jaw and tooth injuries that required surgery and hospitalization for a week. Although the assailants fled the scene and the park, they were identified by Middletown Township Police as being from New York. Both suspects were eventually charged in the assault with one subject being arrested by the United States Marshals Service in New York and the second making arrangements to surrender to the Middletown Township Police. Both suspects were also banned permanently from all SeaWorld Parks & Entertainment facilities.
 In July 2022, Sesame Place faced criticism after an African American family claimed in an Instagram post that the character Rosita snubbed their two young children by ignoring them as they waved to her. The video went viral as other users posted similar incidents of costumed characters and black children, with those on social media calling for a boycott of the park. The park released a statement that the costume had made it difficult for the performer to see the girls. They later followed with another statement that the performer had not intentionally snubbed the girls, but instead rejected a request "from someone in the crowd who asked Rosita to hold their child for a photo which is not permitted." On July 19, Sesame Place Pennsylvania formally apologized to the family and invited the family back for a personal meet-and-greet with the characters. They also announced that their employees will undergo racial bias training to ensure park guests have an "inclusive, equitable and entertaining" experience.

Water Country USA

Surfer's Bay
 On August 6, 1996, a 39-year-old man was shot in the back by a bullet while in the wave pool. He was taken to the park's first aid station then went to a local hospital for treatment and recovered from his injury.

See also
 Blackfish
 Amusement park accidents

References

SeaWorld Parks & Entertainment
SeaWorld